The Church of St John the Baptist is an Anglican parish church in Hinton Charterhouse, Somerset, England. It was built in the 12th century and has been designated as a Grade II* listed building.

The church pre-dates the former Carthusian Hinton Priory in the village which dates from 1232. The priory was founded in 1232 by Ela, Countess of Salisbury, and the prior had the right to tithes from the village following a dispute, and to appoint the vicar of the church until the Dissolution of the Monasteries in 1539.

During the 13th century the south chapel and porch were added to the original 12th-century building. Restoration of the three-stage tower took place in 1770, and there was further restoration in the 19th century.

The parish is part of the benefice of Freshford, Limpley Stoke and Hinton Charterhouse within the archdeaconry of Bath.

See also
 List of ecclesiastical parishes in the Diocese of Bath and Wells

References

12th-century church buildings in England
Church of England church buildings in Bath and North East Somerset
Grade II* listed churches in Somerset
Grade II* listed buildings in Bath and North East Somerset